Von Roll Holding AG is a Swiss industrial group that operates worldwide. It was founded in 1803. As one of Switzerland’s longest-established industrial companies, Von Roll focuses today on products and systems for electrical applications such as power generation, transmission, and storage as well as e-mobility and industrial applications.

History 
Von Roll has its roots in the Eisenwerke der Handelsgesellschaft der Gebrüder Dürholz & Co. (Ironworks of the commercial firm of the Brothers Durholz & Co.) which was established in 1803. This firm was then taken over in 1810 by Von Roll & Cie, newly formed by Ludwig Freiherr von Roll (1771–1839) and Jakob von Glutz. In May 1823, Ludwig von Roll founded the Gesellschaft der Ludwig von Roll'schen Eisenwerke which benefited from industrialization and railroad construction that demanded a lot of iron.

Von Roll participated in the construction of the Wetterhorn Elevator in 1908.

Following this, the business developed into one of the most important industrial groups in Switzerland with more than 10,000 employees in the 1970s. Like other Swiss companies, Von Roll suffered during the oil crisis of 1973. The company underwent financial restructuring after financial restructuring, seemingly without end. As recently as 2003, Von Roll had to fight for its survival. At the end of 2002, following the accumulated losses of previous years, Von Roll’s equity capital had shrunk to 10.3 million. In 2004 the company initiated a new strategy to focus on the insulation business, beginning its turnaround.

The main shareholder is in early 2019 August von Finck Jr. family with above 65% of the quotes.  After the conversion of some convertible bonds in December 2018 the composition of shareholders became unclear. In 2019 the company is involved in law case for some salaries paid in euro (€).

Von Roll Seilbahnen AG 
Von Roll Seilbahnen AG was the aerial tramway and cableway division that was sold to Austrian manufacturer Doppelmayr in 1996.

Products
Perhaps Von Roll's best-known product was the type 101 sky ride or simply "VR101" that operated in many amusement parks. A total of over 100 were installed as of 2008 only ten remained operational .
On 30 December 1954 Felseneggbahn was opened. It was built by Von Roll in seven months for one million Swiss francs.  It still runs, and on 31 March 2010, it carried its 10 millionth passenger. 
The Disneyland Skyway was Von Roll's first aerial ropeway in the United States. It opened on 23 June 1956 and closed on 9 November 1994. The first Von Roll VR101 was built in Films, in 1944, and replaced in 1986.

Operating Von Roll Type 101s

Former Von Roll Type 101's

Monorail

The Mk II and Mk III monorail automated people mover (APM) systems were installed in a variety of locations before the technology was sold to Adtranz (later Bombardier), which continues to supply the parts for the monorail systems.

AirTrain Newark opened in 1996 and is a Von Roll system. The AirTrain Newark system was extended to connect with Amtrak and NJ Transit in 2001.

The monorail cars at Alton Towers theme park in England were built for Expo 86 in Vancouver, British Columbia, Canada.

Von Roll also manufactured the old Sentosa Monorail in Sentosa Island, Singapore, in 1982, which closed down in March 2005.

The Jurong Bird Park Panorail in Jurong Bird Park, Singapore is a four-car straddle-beam monorail that began operation in 1991 and ceased operations in 2012.

Australia has had a total of four Von Roll Monorail systems, currently one is still in operation. A Von Roll MkII system is in operation at Sea World theme park on the Gold Coast (first monorail in Australia which opened in 1986). A MkIII Monorail system in nearby Broadbeach linking Oasis Shopping Centre to Jupiter's Hotel & Casino opened in 1989, but closed on 29 January 2017 due to life-expired equipment and declining patronage. Another MkIII Monorail system, the Sydney Monorail, operated in Australia linking the City Centre to Darling Harbour, however monorail services ceased on 30 June 2013 (it began operation on 21 July 1988). A MkII Monorail system was also in operation during World Expo 88 held in Brisbane, Australia, with a loop around the expo site at Southbank. There is no trace of the monorail system at the site.

Space Towers
Cedar Point's Space Spiral, Astro World's Astro needle and Coney's Space Tower were built by Willy Bühler Space Towers Company of Berne, Switzerland, with cabins by Von Roll. In 1971 Intamin started marketing these towers and contracted these same companies to build them. Willy Bühler Space Towers was eventually acquired by Von Roll.

Funicular systems
 Falls Incline Railway, Niagara Falls, Ontario, Canada, 1966

See also 
 Von Roll rack system
 List of aerial lift manufacturers

References

External links

 http://www.vonroll.com/

Energy companies of Switzerland
Companies based in the canton of Solothurn
Companies established in 1803
Energy companies established in 1803
Companies listed on the SIX Swiss Exchange
Aerial lift manufacturers
Doppelmayr/Garaventa Group